3',4'-Methylenedioxy-4-methylaminorex (MDMAR) is a recreational designer drug from the substituted aminorex family, with monoamine releasing effects.

See also 
 2C-B-aminorex
 4,4'-DMAR
 4'-Fluoro-4-methylaminorex
 5-MAPB
 MDMA
 Methylenedioxyphenmetrazine
 List of aminorex analogues

References 

Designer drugs
Benzodioxoles
Oxazoles
Amines